Walter Lee Mingledorff Jr. (November 7, 1914 – February 18, 1985) was a politician from Georgia, United States, and was a former Mayor of Savannah. He was a Democrat and belonged to the local Citizen's Committee faction of the party.

Background
He was born in the Savannah area and made a career in the shipyard industry. He was married to Huldah Cail.

Political career

City politics
Mingledorff ran for Mayor of Savannah and defeated Conservative Democratic candidate Charles Musante in 1954. He took office in early 1955 and became the first Savannah mayor to serve under the council-manager form of municipal government. The number of aldermen was reduced from twelve to six under the new city charter.

He was re-elected for a two-year term in 1956 and for a four-year term in 1958.

The Mingledorff administration is credited with a number of accomplishments, including:

 Eliminating the city's deficit
 Establishing a municipal civil service
 Implementing an urban renewal program
 Improving the road system, with the construction of expressways

County politics
Mingledorff resigned in 1960 to become a candidate on the Chatham County Commission. Even though his slate of candidates won the election, he failed to win a seat. He was succeeded as Mayor by Malcolm Maclean.

References

External links
Mayor's official site

1914 births
1985 deaths
Mayors of Savannah, Georgia
20th-century American politicians